Lophosteus is an extinct genus of prehistoric bony fish known from the Pridoli Ohesaare Formation of Estonia.

See also 
 Prehistoric fish
 List of prehistoric bony fish

References

External links 
 Donglei Chen et al.: The developmental relationship between teeth and dermal odontodes in the most primitive bony fish Lophosteus. In: eLife. Dec 15, 2020. doi:10.7554/eLife.60985. Along with:
 Primitive fish fossils reveal developmental origins of teeth. On: EurekAlert! 15-Dec-2020 

Prehistoric bony fish genera
Pridoli life
Silurian fish of Europe
Silurian Estonia
Fossils of Estonia
Fossil taxa described in 1856